Hypo Tirol Innsbruck is a professional volleyball team based in Innsbruck, Austria. It plays in the Austrian Volley League.

2014–15 Team

Honours
Austrian Volley League: 2005, 2006, 2009, 2010, 2011, 2012, 2014, 2015, 2016, 2017
MEVZA League: 2009, 2012, 2015

External links
Official website 

Austrian volleyball clubs
Volleyball clubs established in 1997
1997 establishments in Austria